Grace Lake is located in Glacier National Park, in the U. S. state of Montana. Mount Geduhn is located to the east of Grace Lake.

See also
 List of lakes in Flathead County, Montana (A-L)
There is also a Grace Lake, near to Blachford Lake in Northwestern Canada.

References

Lakes of Glacier National Park (U.S.)
Lakes of Flathead County, Montana